Oiva Virtanen (5 August 1929 – 26 September 1992) was a Finnish basketball player. He competed in the men's tournament at the 1952 Summer Olympics.

References

1929 births
1992 deaths
Finnish men's basketball players
Olympic basketball players of Finland
Basketball players at the 1952 Summer Olympics
Sportspeople from Helsinki